Bakke Mountain is a summit located in the town of Florida, Massachusetts. It was named for Master Sergeant Roald Bakke, who died in the collapse of Texas Tower 4.  The mountain is the scene of wildlife and forest conservation efforts and serves as one of the primary sites of the Hoosac Wind Project. The Bakke Mountain Wind Farm  is an alternative energy wind plant located on the mountain.

Forest and Wildlife Management

When the property was first purchased by the Bakke family in the 1960s, the fields and meadows lined with rock walls used for small livestock grazing were still open and free of tree growth. As time went on and the fields went unused, low brush sprang up, followed by saplings, which by 2000 had become a full-fledged forest.

According to the plans for the area,  of this area will be maintained as field, while the second  portion will be maintained as staggered wildlife environment, ranging from low brush to the majestic trees native to New England.

References 

Berkshires
Mountains of Berkshire County, Massachusetts